TinyFugue, or tf, is a MUD client, primarily written for Unix-like operating systems. It is one of the earliest MUD clients in existence. It is a successor to the earliest MUD client, TinyTalk, through a never-officially-released improved version called TinyWar. Like the name suggests, it is primarily geared toward TinyMUD variants, but can easily be used or adapted for most other MUD types.

TinyFugue is a terminal application. It is usually used in split-screen display mode, which means it has a separate gameplay area, a status line and text input area. For MUDs that use prompts (LPMuds, for instance) the prompt is also displayed in the input area. The text input area allows the commands to be edited before sent to MUD, and also has full command history.

TinyFugue is extensible through its own macro language, which also ties to its extensive trigger system.  The trigger system allows implementation of automatically run commands, text highlighting and coloring, text filtering (user gagging or spam filtering), and like.

TinyFugue was developed by Ken Keys until 2008, and took the versions the software to 4.0 stable 1 (stable) and 5.0 beta 8 (development). These versions, and a discussion forum based on these branches, are still available at the TinyFugue SourceForge project site. In 2014, after both the stable and development versions of the software had been dormant for 6 years, another developer effectively resumed the project with a GitHub fork of the development version, calling it "TinyFugue – Rebirth". New features such as Python, Lua, and Widechar support have since been added.

TinyFugue is distributed under GPL, and it is included in most Linux distributions and works on most Unix-like operating systems. (Some Linux distributions carry the Keys versions, some have begun to embrace the GitHub project fork.) A Keys version also exists for Microsoft Windows, and unofficial ports also exist for many platforms.

References

External links
 Official home page

MUD clients